The 65th Academy Awards ceremony, presented by the Academy of Motion Picture Arts and Sciences (AMPAS), honored films released in 1992 in the United States and took place on March 29, 1993, at the Dorothy Chandler Pavilion in Los Angeles beginning at 6:00 p.m. PST / 9:00 p.m. EST. During the ceremony, AMPAS presented Academy Awards (commonly referred to as Oscars) in 23 categories. The ceremony, televised in the United States by ABC, was produced by Gil Cates and directed by Jeff Margolis. Actor Billy Crystal hosted the show for the fourth consecutive year. In related events, during a ceremony held at the Century Plaza Hotel in Los Angeles on March 6, the Academy Awards for Technical Achievement were presented by host Sharon Stone.

Unforgiven won four Oscars, including Best Picture.  Other winners included Bram Stoker's Dracula and Howards End with three awards, Aladdin with two, and The Crying Game, Death Becomes Her, Educating Peter, Indochine, The Last of the Mohicans, Mona Lisa Descending a Staircase, My Cousin Vinny, Omnibus, The Panama Deception, A River Runs Through It, and Scent of a Woman with one. The telecast garnered 45.7 million viewers in the United States.

Winners and nominees
The nominees for the 65th Academy Awards were announced on February 17, 1993, at the Samuel Goldwyn Theater in Beverly Hills, California, by Robert Rehme, president of the academy, and actress Mercedes Ruehl. Howards End and Unforgiven led all nominees with nine nominations each.

The winners were announced during the awards ceremony on March 29, 1993. Best Director winner Clint Eastwood became the seventh person nominated for lead acting and directing for the same film. Best Actor winner Al Pacino was the sixth performer to receive nominations in the lead and supporting categories in the same year. He also became the first person to win in the lead acting category after achieving the aforementioned feat. By virtue of his second straight win in both music categories, Alan Menken became the third person to win two Oscars in two consecutive years.

Awards

Winners are listed first, highlighted in boldface, and indicated with a double dagger.

{| class=wikitable
| valign="top" width="50%" |

Unforgiven – Clint Eastwood, producer The Crying Game – Stephen Woolley, producer
 A Few Good Men – David Brown, Rob Reiner and Andrew Scheinman, producers
 Howards End – Ismail Merchant, producer
 Scent of a Woman – Martin Brest, producer
| valign="top" |Clint Eastwood – Unforgiven
 Neil Jordan – The Crying Game
 James Ivory – Howards End
 Robert Altman – The Player
 Martin Brest – Scent of a Woman
|-
| valign="top" |

Al Pacino – Scent of a Woman as Lieutenant Colonel Frank Slade
 Robert Downey Jr. – Chaplin as Charlie Chaplin
 Clint Eastwood – Unforgiven as William "Will" Munny
 Stephen Rea – The Crying Game as Fergus
 Denzel Washington – Malcolm X as Malcolm X
| valign="top" |

Emma Thompson – Howards End as Margaret Schlegel
 Catherine Deneuve – Indochine as Éliane Devries
 Mary McDonnell – Passion Fish as May-Alice Culhane
 Michelle Pfeiffer – Love Field as Lurene Hallett
 Susan Sarandon – Lorenzo's Oil as Michaela Odone
|-
| valign="top" |

Gene Hackman – Unforgiven as Little Bill Daggett
 Jaye Davidson – The Crying Game as Dil
 Jack Nicholson – A Few Good Men as Colonel Nathan R. Jessup
 Al Pacino – Glengarry Glen Ross as Ricky Roma
 David Paymer – Mr. Saturday Night as Stan Young
| valign="top" |

Marisa Tomei – My Cousin Vinny as Mona Lisa Vito
 Judy Davis – Husbands and Wives as Sally Wainwright
 Joan Plowright – Enchanted April as Mrs. Fisher
 Vanessa Redgrave – Howards End as Ruth Wilcox
 Miranda Richardson – Damage as Ingrid Fleming
|-
| valign="top" |

The Crying Game – Neil Jordan
 Husbands and Wives – Woody Allen
 Lorenzo's Oil – George Miller and Nick Enright
 Passion Fish – John Sayles
 Unforgiven – David Webb Peoples
| valign="top" |

Howards End – Ruth Prawer Jhabvala based on the novel by E.M. Forster Enchanted April – Peter Barnes based on the novel by Elizabeth von Arnim
 The Player – Michael Tolkin based on his novel
 A River Runs Through It – Richard Friedenberg based upon the story by Norman Maclean
 Scent of a Woman – Bo Goldman based on the previous film Profumo di donna by Ruggero Maccari and Dino Risi and the novel Il Buio E Il Miele by Giovanni Arpino
|-
| valign="top" |Indochine (France) in French – Régis Wargnier, director Close to Eden (Russia) in Russian – Nikita Mikhalkov, director
 Daens (Belgium) in Dutch – Stijn Coninx, director
 Schtonk! (Germany) in German – Helmut Dietl, director
| valign="top" |The Panama Deception – Barbara Trent and David Kasper Changing Our Minds: The Story of Dr. Evelyn Hooker – David Haugland
 Fires of Kuwait – Sally Dundas
 The Liberators: Fighting on Two Fronts in World War II – Bill Miles and Nina Rosenblum
 Music for the Movies: Bernard Herrmann – Margaret Smilow and Roma Baran
|-
| valign="top" |Educating Peter – Thomas C. Goodwin (posthumous award) and Gerardine Wurzburg At the Edge of Conquest: The Journey of Chief Wai-Wai – Geoffrey O'Connor
 Beyond Imagining: Margaret Anderson and the 'Little Review' – Wendy L. Weinberg
 The Colours of My Father: A Portrait of Sam Borenstein – Richard Elson and Sally Bochner
 When Abortion Was Illegal: Untold Stories – Dorothy Fadiman
| valign="top" |Omnibus – Sam KarmannContact – Jonathan Darby and Jana Sue Memel
 Cruise Control – Matt Palmieri
 The Lady in Waiting – Christian M. Taylor
 Swan Song – Kenneth Branagh and David Parfitt
|-
| valign="top" |Mona Lisa Descending a Staircase – Joan C. Gratz Adam – Peter Lord
 Reci, reci, reci – Michaela Pavlátová
 The Sandman – Paul Berry
 Screen Play – Barry Purves
| valign="top" |Aladdin – Alan Menken Basic Instinct – Jerry Goldsmith
 Chaplin – John Barry
 Howards End – Richard Robbins
 A River Runs Through It – Mark Isham
|-
| valign="top" |"A Whole New World" from Aladdin – Music by Alan Menken; Lyrics by Tim Rice "Friend Like Me" from Aladdin – Music by Alan Menken; Lyrics by Howard Ashman (posthumous nomination)
 "I Have Nothing" from The Bodyguard – Music by David Foster; Lyrics by Linda Thompson
 "Run to You" from The Bodyguard – Music by Jud Friedman; Lyrics by Allan Rich
 "Beautiful Maria of My Soul" from The Mambo Kings – Music by Robert Kraft; Lyrics by Arne Glimcher
| valign="top" |Bram Stoker's Dracula – David E. Stone and Tom McCarthy Aladdin – Mark Mangini
 Under Siege – John Leveque and Bruce Stambler
|-
| valign="top" |The Last of the Mohicans – Chris Jenkins, Doug Hemphill, Mark Smith and Simon Kaye Aladdin – Terry Porter, Mel Metcalfe, David J. Hudson and Doc Kane
 A Few Good Men – Kevin O'Connell, Rick Kline and Robert Eber
 Under Siege – Donald O. Mitchell, Frank A. Montaño, Rick Hart and Scott D. Smith
 Unforgiven – Les Fresholtz, Vern Poore, Dick Alexander and Rob Young
| valign="top" |Howards End – Art Direction: Luciana Arrighi; Set Decoration: Ian Whittaker Bram Stoker's Dracula – Art Direction: Thomas E. Sanders; Set Decoration: Garrett Lewis
 Chaplin – Art Direction: Stuart Craig; Set Decoration: Chris A. Butler
 Toys – Art Direction: Ferdinando Scarfiotti; Set Decoration: Linda DeScenna
 Unforgiven – Art Direction: Henry Bumstead; Set Decoration: Janice Blackie-Goodine
|-
| valign="top" |A River Runs Through It – Philippe Rousselot Hoffa – Stephen H. Burum
 Howards End – Tony Pierce-Roberts
 The Lover – Robert Fraisse
 Unforgiven – Jack N. Green
| valign="top" |Bram Stoker's Dracula – Greg Cannom, Michèle Burke and Matthew W. Mungle Batman Returns – Ve Neill, Ronnie Specter and Stan Winston
 Hoffa – Ve Neill, Greg Cannom and John Blake
|-
| valign="top" |Bram Stoker's Dracula – Eiko Ishioka Enchanted April – Sheena Napier
 Howards End – Jenny Beavan and John Bright
 Malcolm X – Ruth E. Carter
 Toys – Albert Wolsky
| valign="top" |Unforgiven – Joel Cox Basic Instinct – Frank J. Urioste
 The Crying Game – Kant Pan
 A Few Good Men – Robert Leighton
 The Player – Geraldine Peroni
|-
| valign="top" colspan="2"|Death Becomes Her'' – Ken Ralston, Doug Chiang, Douglas Smythe and Tom Woodruff Jr.
 Alien³ – Richard Edlund, Alec Gillis, Tom Woodruff Jr. and George Gibbs
 Batman Returns – Michael L. Fink, Craig Barron, John Bruno and Dennis Skotak
|}

Academy Honorary Award
Federico Fellini  In recognition of his place as one of the screen's master storytellers.

Jean Hersholt Humanitarian Awards
The award recognizes individuals whose humanitarian efforts have brought credit to the motion picture industry.

Audrey Hepburn (posthumous award)
Elizabeth Taylor

Films with multiple nominations and awards

Presenters and performers
The following individuals (in order of appearance) presented awards or performed musical numbers:

Presenters

Performers

Ceremony information

After the success of the previous year's ceremony which won several Emmys and critical acclaim, the academy rehired producer Gil Cates for the fourth consecutive year. In February 1993, actor and comedian Billy Crystal was chosen by Cates as host also for the fourth straight time. Cates justified the decision to hire him saying, "He is a major movie star with a talent for moving the evening's entertainment along." According to an article by Army Archerd published in Variety, Crystal initially declined to host again citing his busy film schedule that included Mr. Saturday Night and City Slickers II: The Legend of Curly's Gold. However, after Cates sent him a funeral wreath with a poem declaring "The show and I are dead without you" followed by a head of a fake dead horse similar to one featured in the film The Godfather, Crystal accepted the role as emcee.

As with previous ceremonies he produced, Cates centered the show around a theme. Inspired by the Year of the Woman in which a record four women were elected to the United States Senate, Cates christened the 1993 show with the theme "Oscar Celebrates Women and the Movies". In tandem with the theme, AMPAS gathered 67 female Oscar winners of every category for a photo that was later shown at the start of the telecast. Actress and singer Liza Minnelli performed "Ladies' Day", a song written by Fred Ebb and John Kander specifically for the broadcast. Oscar-winning documentarian Lynne Littman assembled a montage highlighting women in film.

Several other people participated in the production of the ceremony. Bill Conti served as conductor and musical supervisor for the ceremony. Choreographer Debbie Allen supervised the Best Song nominee performances and the "Ladies' Night" musical number. Voice actress Randy Thomas served as announcer of the telecast becoming the first woman to do so.

Box office performance of nominees

At the time of the nominations announcement on February 17, the combined gross of the five Best Picture nominees at the US box office was $252 million, with an average of $50.4 million per film. A Few Good Men was the highest earner among the Best Picture nominees with $120 million in domestic box office receipts. The film was followed by Unforgiven ($75.2 million), Scent of a Woman ($34.1 million), The Crying Game ($14 million), and finally Howards End ($8.7 million).

Of the top 50 grossing movies of the year, 38 nominations went to 13 films on the list. Only A Few Good Men (6th), Unforgiven (17th), Malcolm X (30th) and Scent of a Woman (38th) were nominated for directing, acting, screenwriting, or Best Picture. The other top 50 box office hits that earned nominations were Aladdin (1st), Batman Returns (3rd), Basic Instinct (8th), The Bodyguard (9th), Under Siege (12th), Bram Stoker's Dracula (14th), The Last of the Mohicans (16th), Death Becomes Her (22nd), and Alien³ (26th).

Critical reviews and ratings
The show received a negative reception from most media publications. Associated Press television critic Frazier Moore lamented that Crystal "seemed incredibly listless". He also questioned the purpose of the "Year of the Woman" theme writing, "The Oscar show itself seemed at odds with its own feminist theme." Robert Bianco from the Pittsburgh Post-Gazette derided Allen's musical production numbers, comparing them to the disastrous opening number at the 61st ceremony held in 1989. Columnist Matt Roush of USA Today complained, "Crystal, in a by-now-familiar performance, has, in four years, taken a plum assignment and, by repetition, reduced it to shtick." He also wrote that, "The song medley is getting old hat," and the "smug references to his flop Mr. Saturday Night were out of an improv amateur night."

The telecast also received unfavorable reaction from various public feminist figures. In an interview with Los Angeles Daily News author and activist Betty Friedan condemned the "Year of the Woman" theme commenting, "It had no basis in reality. On behalf of women directors, cinematographer, and producers, I resent the travesty of calling that a tribute." Likewise, President of the National Organization for Women's Los Angeles chapter Tammy Bruce chastised ceremony's feminist tribute as "one of the most hypocritical, patronizing things I saw in my whole life." In response, Gil Cates responded towards the criticism of the theme stating, "The theme developed and raised consciousness in a way that I think is positive, not only for the individual in general but for individual women specifically." He also quoted an ancient Chinese proverb later made famous by former U.S. First Lady Eleanor Roosevelt saying, "It is better to light one candle than to curse the darkness."

Despite the adverse reception, the ABC broadcast drew in an average of 45.7 million people over its length, which was a 3% increase from the previous year's ceremony. The show also drew higher Nielsen ratings compared to the previous ceremony with 31.2% of households watching over a 51 share. It also drew a higher 18–49 demo rating with a 20.1 rating among viewers in that demographic.

See also

 13th Golden Raspberry Awards
 35th Grammy Awards
 45th Primetime Emmy Awards
 46th British Academy Film Awards
 47th Tony Awards
 50th Golden Globe Awards
 List of submissions to the 65th Academy Awards for Best Foreign Language Film

 Notes 
A: The Academy revoked the Best Foreign Language Film nomination of Uruguay's A Place in the World'' after an investigation that determined the film as an Argentine production and therefore violated the Academy's rules which require that there be "substantial filmmaking input from the country that submits the film."

B: Hepburn died on January 20, 1993, shortly after AMPAS announced the honor. Her son Sean accepted the award at the ceremony on her behalf.

References

Bibliography

External links
Official websites
 Academy Awards Official website
 The Academy of Motion Picture Arts and Sciences Official website
 Oscar's Channel at YouTube (run by the Academy of Motion Picture Arts and Sciences)

Analysis
 1992 Academy Awards Winners and History Filmsite
 Academy Awards, USA: 1993 Internet Movie Database

Other resources
 

1992 film awards
1993 in American cinema
Academy Awards ceremonies
1993 in Los Angeles
March 1993 events in the United States
Academy
Television shows directed by Jeff Margolis